This is a list of content-control software and services. The software is designed to control what content may or may not be viewed by a reader, especially when used to restrict material delivered over the Internet via the Web, e-mail, or other means. Restrictions can be applied at various levels: a government can apply them nationwide, an ISP can apply them to its clients, an employer to its personnel, a school to its teachers and/or students, a library to its patrons and/or staff, a parent to a child's computer or computer account or an individual to his or her own computer.

Programs and services

Providers

 Amesys
 Awareness Technologies
 Barracuda Networks
 Blue Coat Systems
 CronLab
 Cyberoam
 Detica
 Fortinet
 GoGuardian
 Huawei
 Isheriff
 Lightspeed Systems
 Retina-X Studios
 SafeDNS
 Securly
 SmoothWall
 SonicWall
 Sophos
 SurfControl
 Webroot
 Websense  
 MICT, MTCI 456

See also
Accountability software
Ad filtering
Computer surveillance
Deep packet inspection
Deep content inspection
Internet censorship
Internet safety
Parental controls
Wordfilter

References

Content-control software and providers
Computing-related lists